Ingrid Dee Magidson is an American artist known for her use of combining industrial materials, collage, paint and Renaissance and Baroque images into transparent layers or shadow boxes.  Influenced by Joseph Cornell, Salvador Dalí and the Surrealists in her use of antique objects, butterflies and insect specimens.  She is largely self-taught, but is heavily involved in contemporary art and in contact with many well known contemporary artists.

Career

Her art career began in 2005 when she started experimenting with flexible transparent sheets of acetate on which Renaissance images had been transferred.  Behind this semi-clear sheet she laid collage, paint and antique objects into a kind of sandwich.  The acetate was not transparent enough to elicit the floating quality of the subject she was searching for and soon moved to rigid panels of clear acrylic or Plexiglas.  By increasing the space between the collaged background, she was able to put more objects and place butterflies into work.  Of particular interest to her work are the Morpho butterflies with their huge wings, intense cobalt blue and reflective surfaces; though she often includes other native and exotic species of butterflies and large insects in her work.  By 2007 she had perfected her technique and amassed enough work to present her art for her first one-woman exhibition.  In 2008, actors Melanie Griffith and Antonio Banderas acquired a large work for their NYC home. In 2011, the Hermitage Museum Foundation in New York City, a non-profit arm of the Hermitage Museum, featured a work of Magidson's dedicated to Catherine the Great at their annual dinner hosted by Sotheby's Auction House. They continued to feature Magidson's work honoring Catherine the Great at their annual dinners in 2012 at Phillips de Pury and 2013 at the Urban Zen Center.  Dara Mitchell, Executive Vice President of American Paintings at Sotheby's saw her work at the close of the 2011 Hermitage Museum Foundation Gala and acquired multiple works. Magidson has had over 30 one-person exhibitions, and 20 group exhibitions to date (2017), including having her work exhibited in international art fairs, such as The Armory Show, New York City, Art Basel Singapore, Zona Maco in Mexico City and Art Toronto, Canada.

Selected exhibitions 
 ArtBase Annex Museum, Basalt, CO 2015
 Hermitage Museum Foundation, NYC, 2011, 2012, 2013
 ArtCrush, Aspen Art Museum annual gala, 2013
 Unix Gallery, NYC, 2013
 Ann Korologos Gallery, Basalt, CO, 2012
 Singleton-Biss Museum of Fine Art, Santa Fe, MN, 2010
 Bill Lowe Gallery, Atlanta, GA, 2009
 Marion Meyer Gallery, Laguna Beach, CA, 2008, 2009
 Anderson Ranch Art Center, 2008 
 Magidson Fine Art Gallery, Aspen, CO, 2007

Notable collections 
 Alpina Gstaad
 Antonio Banderas
 Jackie Bezos (philanthropist, mother of Jeff Bezos)
 Gideon Gartner
 Dara Mitchell (former Executive V.P. of American Paintings, Sotheby's Auction House, NYC)
 Lloyd Schermer
 Sam Wyly

References

Further reading
 Editor's review. Womankind (magazine), Australia, November 2015 - January 2016.
 Cover of Miami Magazine. Modern Luxury, Article with images, December 2013.
 Cover Miroir Magazine. Review with images, April 2013.
 Exhibition review. The Aspen Times, August 2, 2013.
 Exhibition review. The Aspen Times,, July 5, 2007.

External links 
 Artist website
 Alpina Gstaad permanent collection
 Houston Press review of exhibition in Houston
 Professional Artist Magazine article
 ArtCrush, Aspen Art Museum
 Hermitage Museum Foundation Benefit, featuring Ingrid Dee Magidson's homage to Catherine the Great
 From Basalt to St. Petersberg - Hermitage Museum Foundation article
 Elusive Muse review of Magidson's work
 Words Social Forum - artist review (English, Italian)
 Local Houston exhibition review

Multimedia artists
Women multimedia artists
Artists from Texas
Artists from Colorado
1965 births
American women painters
American abstract artists
Mixed-media artists
Living people
21st-century American women artists